Clean Head's Back in Town, subtitled Eddie Vinson Sings, is an album by the American saxophonist and vocalist Eddie "Cleanhead" Vinson. Recorded in 1957, it was released by Bethlehem Records.

Reception

AllMusic reviewer Scott Yanow wrote that "...this infectious set finds him performing some of his best known tunes. With assistance by a medium-size group that plays in a Count Basie groove ... A good sampling of the great Cleanhead.".

Track listing
All compositions by Eddie "Cleanhead" Vinson, Dossie Terry and William Gray except where noted
 "Cleanhead's Back in Town" − 3:02
 "That's the Way to Treat Your Woman" − 2:30
 "Trouble in Mind" (Richard M. Jones) − 2:28
 "Kidney Stew Blues" (Vinson, Leona Blackman) − 2:30
 "Sweet Lovin' Baby" (Charles Darwin) − 2:58
 "Caldonia" (Fleecie Moore) − 2:51
 "It Ain't Necessarily So" (George Gershwin, Ira Gershwin) − 2:49
 "Cherry Red" (Pete Johnson, Big Joe Turner) − 2:44
 "Is You Is or Is You Ain't My Baby" (Louis Jordan, Bill Austin) − 2:52
 "I Just Can't Keep the Tears from Tumblin' Down" (Darwin) − 3:13
 "Your Baby Ain't Sweet Like Mine" − 2:27
 "Hold It Right There" − 2:30
 "Trouble in Mind" [alternate take] (Jones) − 2:26
 "Kidney Stew Blues" [alternate take] (Vinson, Blackman) − 2:28
 "Hold It Right There" [alternate take] − 2:24

Personnel
Eddie "Cleanhead" Vinson − alto saxophone, vocals
Joe Newman − trumpet
Henry Coker − trombone
Bill Graham − alto saxophone (tracks 1, 4, 5, 7-11 & 13–15)
Charlie Rouse (tracks 2, 3, 6 & 12), Frank Foster (tracks 1, 5, 10 & 11), Paul Quinichette (tracks 2–4, 6-9 & 12 to 15) − tenor saxophone
Charles Fowlkes − baritone saxophone
Nat Pierce − piano
Freddie Green (tracks 2, 3, 6 & 12), Turk Van Lake (tracks 1, 4, 5, 7-11 & 13–15) − guitar
Ed Jones − bass
Ed Thigpen (tracks 2–4, 6-9 & 12–15), Gus Johnson (tracks: 1, 5, 10, 11) − drums
Ernie Wilkins (tracks 1, 4, 7-9 & 11), Harry Tubbs (tracks 5, 6, 10 & 12), Manny Albam (tracks 2 & 3) − arranger

References

Bethlehem Records albums
1957 albums
Eddie Vinson albums
Albums arranged by Manny Albam
Albums arranged by Ernie Wilkins